David Steiner may refer to:
 David Steiner (academic) (born 1958), New York State Education Commissioner and President of the University of the State of New York
 David Steiner (AIPAC), American businessman and former President of AIPAC, resigned 1992
 David Eduard Steiner (1811–1860), Swiss painter
 David J. Steiner (1965–2016), American documentary filmmaker, educator and political activist
 David P. Steiner (born 1960), American business executive in the waste management industry